The Loop Shuttle was a rapid transit line on the Chicago "L". It operated clockwise around the Loop, making stops at all stations. The line was inaugurated September 30, 1969 and discontinued September 30, 1977.

Operations

The line provided service Monday through Saturday during the day, with no late night or Sunday service. Evening service was dropped later in its life. The line typically used two-car 6000-series assigned to Kimball Yard.

During weekday rush hours, the Evanston Express was the only other route to travel clockwise and use the inner track. Southbound Lake–Dan Ryan trains shared the inner track on the Lake and Wabash segment.

While the CTA did not formally adopt color-coded lines during its lifetime, the Loop Shuttle was depicted as gray or black on color maps.

History
Opportunity for a continuous "L" line around the Loop was realized in 1969, when modifications were underway to allow through service of the Lake Street branch to the newly completed Dan Ryan branch. Prior to this all trains ran counter-clockwise, with Ravenswood and Evanston Express trains using the outer track and Lake Street trains using the inner track. The new Lake–Dan Ryan Line began on September 28, 1969 and Loop Shuttle service began two days later on September 30. The Ravenswood Line would continue operating counter-clockwise via the outer track and Evanston Express trains would shift to operating clockwise around the inner track on September 30.

The Loop Shuttle was quietly discontinued on September 30, 1977 as a cost-cutting measure. After the Loop Shuttle's discontinuation, the Evanston Express remained the only route to run clockwise around the Loop. Full time service around the inner loop was restored with the introduction of the Orange Line in 1993 and later the Pink Line in 2006.

Station Listing

References

 
Railway lines in Chicago
Railway lines opened in 1969
1969 establishments in Illinois